The following highways are numbered 3B:

United States
 Massachusetts Route 3B (former)
 New Hampshire Route 3B (former)
 New York State Route 3B (former)
 Nevada State Route 3B (former)